Blankenburg is a German locality (Ortsteil) within the borough (Bezirk) of Pankow, Berlin. Until 2001 it was part of the former borough of Weißensee.

History
The locality, first mentioned in 1375, was an autonomous municipality of the former Niederbarnim district, merged into Berlin in 1920 with the "Greater Berlin Act".

Geography
Blankenburg is located in the north-eastern suburb of Berlin and borders with the localities of Französisch Buchholz, Karow, Stadtrandsiedlung Malchow, Heinersdorf and, in a brief point, Pankow.

Transport
The locality is served by the Berlin S-Bahn lines S2, S8 and S9, at Blankenburg station, and by bus lines 150, 154 and 158. Blankenburger boundary with Französisch Buchholz is crossed by the motorway A114 and the nearest exit serving the locality is the n.4 ("Pasewalker Straße").

Personalities
 Johannes Maus (1916–1985), actor

Photogallery

References

External links

 Blankenburg official website

Localities of Berlin

Populated places established in the 1370s